Jeremy Saulnier (born June 10, 1976) is an American film director, cinematographer and screenwriter.

Career
In 2007, he released his first feature film, Murder Party which he wrote and directed starring his childhood friend, Macon Blair.

In 2013, he released Blue Ruin which was met with critical acclaim. It holds a 96% on Rotten Tomatoes and 77/100 in Metacritic. He was nominated for the John Cassavetes Award at the 2015 Film Independent Spirit Awards and made a run at Cannes.

In 2015, Saulnier directed his third feature film, the horror-thriller Green Room, which stars Patrick Stewart, Anton Yelchin, and Imogen Poots. The movie was distributed by A24 and was certified fresh with a 90% rating on Rotten Tomatoes.

Saulnier's latest film is an adaptation of William Giraldi's 2014 thriller novel Hold the Dark for Netflix, from a screenplay by Macon Blair.

Filmography
Short films

Feature films

Television

Cinematographer only
 Hamilton (2006)
 'Tis Autumn: The Search for Jackie Paris (2006) (Documentary)
 Putty Hill (2010)
 Septien (2011)
 You Hurt My Feelings (2011)
 Rett: There is Hope (2011) (Documentary)
 In Our Nature (2012)
 See Girl Run (2012)
 The Art of Boxing (2012) (Documentary short)
 I Used to Be Darker (2013)

References

External links

Living people
1976 births
Screenwriters from Virginia
American cinematographers
English-language film directors
Horror film directors
Film directors from Virginia
Writers from Alexandria, Virginia
21st-century American screenwriters
21st-century American male writers